State Route 79 (SR 79) is a  state highway in southwestern Lake County, Tennessee.  SR 79 has a dual primary and secondary designation and is one of a few state routes in Tennessee to have an aggregate (gravel) road surface.

Route description
The western terminus of SR 79 is located at the Mississippi River (Island 15) in the extreme southwestern portion of Lake County, Tennessee and travels across low-lying areas that are subject to flooding from the Mississippi River.  SR 79 from its western terminus (mile 0.00) to mile 6.66 has been repeatedly damaged by seasonal flooding and as a result TDOT uses gravel, crushed stone, sand and dirt to rebuild the road surface when it has been damaged from flooding.  This section is unsigned in the field. At mile 6.66, SR 79 crosses the federal levee to its eastern terminus near Ridgely, Tennessee.

History
SR 79 was known as Powell Ferry Road prior to its designation as a state route and served the Powell Ferry (also known as the Pemiscot Ferry) that crossed the Mississippi River to Caruthersville, Missouri.  This ferry began service in 1895 and was operated by Lee Line Steamers.  The roadway geometry of SR 79 has been changed very little since its designation as a state highway with the only major change being at the junction of SR 79 and SR 181.

Major intersections

References

External links

 Tennessee Department of Transportation
 Hathaway, TN History

079
Transportation in Lake County, Tennessee